Iron Lord (Yaroslav, Tysyachu let Nazad (Yaroslav, A Thousand Years Ago)) is a 2010 Russian historical adventure film by director Dmitry Korobkin. It is a full-length feature film that tells the story of Yaroslav the Wise, and it was created as part of the preparation for the 1000th anniversary of Yaroslavl City.

Cast 
 Aleksandr Ivashkevich as Yaroslav
 Svetlana Chuykina as Raida
 Aleksei Kravchenko as Harald
 Viktor Verzhbitskiy as Svyatozar
 Valery Zolotukhin as Churillo

References

External links 
 

2010 films
2010s historical adventure films
2010s biographical films
2010s Russian-language films
Russian historical adventure films
Russian historical action films
Biographical action films
Russian biographical films
Films set in Russia
Films set in the 11th century